Sabyasachi is a Bengali patriotic drama film directed by Pijush Bose and produced by Asim Sarkar based on the novel Pather Dabi written by Sarat Chandra Chattopadhyay. This film was released on 21 January 1977 under the banner of Usha Films. The film is one of the best films of Uttam Kumar career and this is the second film after Kal Tumi Aleya in 1966 where Uttam composed the film and in the film Uttam gave also his one of the finest performance in his career. The film became successful at the box office when it's re-released

Plot
The plot revolves with the activities of an absconded Bengali revolutionary Sabyasachi and India's freedom movement against the British rule. The protagonist Sabyasachi forms a secrete revolutionary organization Pather Dabi. He is extremely talented, highly educated, courageous and committed to his organisation. He meets Rose in a brothel and inspires her to come into the freedom struggle. Rose become Sumitra and takes active part to organise the movement. Several other revolutionaries join with them to lead an armed uprising. Sabyasachi also inspires Apuraba and Bharati, a Bengali couple. But there is a story of betrayal behind Sabyasachi to gain the leadership, love and power.

Cast
 Uttam Kumar as Sabyasachi / Doctor
 Supriya Devi as Rose / Sumitra
 Anil Chatterjee as Brajendra
 Tarun Kumar as Kabi
 Bikash Roy as Police officer
 Sulata Chowdhury as Burmese servant 
 Shambhu Bhattacharya as Police officer
 Nripati Chattopadhyay
 Haradhan Bandopadhyay
 Sujata Dutta as Nabatara
 Kiran Lahiri
 Satya Bandyopadhyay
 Mantu Bandyopadhyay

Music

References

External links
 

1977 films
Bengali-language Indian films
1970s Bengali-language films
Films based on works by Sarat Chandra Chattopadhyay
Indian drama films
Indian black-and-white films
Films based on Indian novels
1977 drama films
Films set in the Indian independence movement
Indian political films